Albert Bontridder (4 April 1921 – 13 December 2015) was a Belgian architect and writer, born in Anderlecht. In 1953 he married Olga Dohnalova, a Czech refugee, and together they had two children.

He graduated as an architect in 1942. As an architect, he made the plan for the house of his friend Louis Paul Boon. He was an editor of the experimental illustrated magazines Tijd en Mens (E: Time and Man) (1949–1955) and Kentering (E: Change) (1966–1977). He published his first poems in French and he made his actual debut with Hoog water (E: high tide) (1951).

Bibliography
 Poésie se brise (poetry, 1951)
 Hoog water (poetry, 1951)
 Dood hout (poetry, 1955)
 Bagatelle – hangende vis (poetry, 1960)
 Jacques Dupuis ou l'architecture perdue et retrouvée (monography, 1961)
 Dialoog tussen licht en stilte (study, 1963)
 Open einde (poetry, 1967)
 De bankreet vader (anthology, 1968)
 Ook de nacht is een zon (poetry, 1969)
 Zelfverbranding (poetry, 1971)
 Gedichten 1942–1972 (1973)
 Voor een waterdruppel (poetry, 1975)
 Vingerknippen naar een vlinder (poetry, 1976)
 Een brug slaan (poetry, 1977)
 Huizen vieren haat (poetry, 1979)
 Gevecht met de rede. Leo Stijnen : leven en werk (essay, 1979)
 Inleiding tot de poëzie van Marcel Wauters (1981)
 Brussel: poëzie over een stad (1981) (and other authors)
 Een oog te veel (poetry, 1984)
 Poésie flamande d' aujoud'hui (essay, 1986)
 Marcel Coole vierde onlangs zijn 80ste verjaardag (article, 1994)
 Versnipperde intenties (poetry, 1997) (and other authors)
 Is de acacia mij bekend (poetry, 1999)

Awards
 1957 – Arkprijs van het Vrije Woord
 1960 – Literaire prijs van de provincie Brabant
 1970 – Dirk Martensprijs
 1972 – Jan Campertprijs

See also
 Flemish literature

References

Sources
 Albert Bontridder
 Albert Bontridder
 Willem M. Roggeman, 'Albert Bontridder' In: Beroepsgeheim 1 (1975)

1921 births
Belgian writers in French
Flemish writers
2015 deaths
Ark Prize of the Free Word winners
People from Anderlecht